Eastern Assyrian may refer to:

 someone or something related to eastern regions of Assyria, in historical or geographical sense
 someone or something related to Eastern Assyrians, in the context of modern Assyrian terminology
 someone or something related to Eastern Assyrian dialects (in modern Assyrian terminology), including:
 Assyrian Neo-Aramaic language, spoken in regions of Iraq, Iran, Turkey and diaspora
 Chaldean Neo-Aramaic language, spoken in regions of Iraq, Iran, Turkey and diaspora

See also
 Assyria (disambiguation)
 Assyrian (disambiguation)
 Western Assyrian (disambiguation)
 Assyrian language (disambiguation)